Garden 5 (hangul: 가든파이브) in Songpa-gu, Seoul is one of South Korea's largest cultural centers. It includes the Garden 5 shopping mall, a multiplex cinema, wedding and art halls, and the NC department store. Garden 5 was opened in 2009 and built by Seoul Housing Corporation.
Garden 5 is served by Jangji station on line 8 of the Seoul Subway.
It was used as one of the movie lots for the movie Take Off.

External links 
 Garden 5 English Page 

Tourist attractions in Seoul
Buildings and structures in Seoul